Hilton Bothamley  was Archdeacon of Bath from 1895 to 1909.

Bothamley was educated at Harrow and Trinity College, Cambridge. He was ordained in 1861 and began his career with a curacy at St John, Weymouth. He held incumbencies at St Nicholas, Peper Harow and St Stephen Landon Bath. He was a Prebendary of Wells Cathedral from 1892 to  1913. 
He died on 1 July 1919 and his funeral service was held on the 7.

Notes

Archdeacons of Bath
Alumni of Trinity College, Cambridge
People educated at Harrow School
Year of birth missing
1919 deaths